Severe Tropical Storm Fern was a damaging storm that struck Yap in the 1996 Pacific typhoon season. A tropical depression formed on December 21, when a low-level circulation center began to produce deep convection. The depression strengthened into a tropical storm the next day, and was given the name Fern by the Joint Typhoon Warning Center (JTWC). The storm slowly intensified into a Category 1 typhoon on the Saffir–Simpson hurricane wind scale, according to JTWC. The storm soon became sheared and weakened slowly. Fern continued to weaken to a tropical depression on December 30. Both agencies stopped advisories later on the same day.

Fern made a direct hit at Yap on Christmas Day. A cargo ship was abandoned after it was damaged by high winds offshore. On the island, Fern caused $3 million (1996 USD) of damage. Roads and bridges were significantly damaged, and other public facilities were destroyed. Crops and private properties also received damage. A state of emergency was declared in Yap State two weeks later, and became a disaster area two months later.

Meteorological history

In the middle of December, twin monsoon troughs were established in the extreme western Pacific Ocean, which will later spawn storms Greg, and Fern itself in the northern hemisphere. The trough in the southern hemisphere spawned cyclones Ophelia, Phil, and Fergus. Around that time, convection began to increase near the equator, and was associated with a westerly wind burst. A low level circulation center was noted by JTWC on December 19 at 0600 UTC. Two days later, convection consolidated near the circulation center, and JMA began tracking it at 0000 UTC as a tropical depression. JTWC issued a Tropical Cyclone Formation Alert at 1500 UTC, as sea level pressure began to deepen, and signs of upper level divergence were found in the system. The first advisory for Tropical Depression 42W followed three hours later, on December 17 at 1200 UTC. JTWC upgraded the depression to a tropical storm on December 22 at 0000 UTC as it traveled westerly, and was given the name Fern. According to JTWC, the wind speeds meandered at minimal tropical storm strength. On Christmas Eve, Fern slowly traveled toward Yap. Fern also began its recurvature that day, beginning its turn north.

JMA continued to keep it as a severe tropical storm at that time. On December 26 at 1200 UTC, Fern reached its peak at 150 km/h (90 mph) north of Yap after its recurvature, according to JTWC. On December 28, Fern began to weaken when it encountered a shear line. Both warning centers downgraded Fern into a tropical depression by December 30, as it continued to travel along a shear line. JTWC issued the final warning at 0600 UTC, while JMA stopped tracking the depression at 1200 UTC. JTWC continued to track the low until December 31, where it stalled north of Guam.

Impact and aftermath
At sea, a cargo ship en route from Guam to Yap was abandoned after it was damaged by high winds. The passengers entered a life raft, and were later found by a Navy search and rescue airplane. They were soon rescued by a Maltese tanker. No one was injured when the accident occurred.

Yap was directly hit by Fern on Christmas Day, causing about $3 million (1996 USD) of damage. One person was injured on the island, and no deaths were attributed to the storm. Roads and bridges were severely damaged, accounting for half of the damage. Homes and other private properties were also significantly damaged. Most crops on the island, such as coconuts, bananas, papayas, and breadfruit, were destroyed by the storm. Public facilities, like schools and hospitals, suffered widespread destruction.

On January 3, 1997, a state of emergency was declared for Yap by Acting President Jacob Nena, stating that Fern caused "an imminent threat to health, safety and welfare of the people of the affected areas." Two months later, on March 20, United States President Bill Clinton declared Yap State a disaster area, allowing the Federal Emergency Management Agency (FEMA) to start the damage assessment of the area. The FEMA funding was only for public facilities, and did not include private properties. The request for individual assistance was not approved by FEMA, as damage to private properties were not much, and assistance from the national government and Yap State were sufficient.

Notes

References

External links
JMA General Information of Severe Tropical Storm Fern (9626) from Digital Typhoon

1996 Pacific typhoon season
Western Pacific severe tropical storms